Rafael García Serrano (11 February 1917 – 12 October 1988) was a Spanish writer and journalist. As a teenager he joined the Spanish Falange and participated as a combatant on the Nationalist side in the Spanish Civil War.  His first novel, the lyrical "Eugenio o proclamación de la primavera" was written in 1938 when he was recovering from tuberculosis contracted during the Battle of the Ebro. That novel was dedicated to the late Jose Antonio Primo de Rivera, the founder of the Falange. He worked as a screenwriter on a number of films. He also directed the 1967 film Lost Eyes. In 1943 he was awarded the National Novel Prize for one of his well-regarded war novels, "La fiel infanteria."  The book was immediately banned for 15 years by the religious censors.

Garcia Serrano never repented of his Falangist past. Despite this, he is still well regarded in Spain for the quality of his writing.

Selected filmography

Screenwriter
 Spanish Serenade (1952)
College Boarding House (1959)
 The Invincible Gladiator (1961)
 The Sailor with Golden Fists (1968)
 Death's Newlyweds (1975)

Director
 Lost Eyes (1967)

References

Bibliography 
 Bentley, Bernard. A Companion to Spanish Cinema. Boydell & Brewer 2008.

External links 
 

1917 births
1988 deaths
Spanish novelists
Spanish male novelists
People from Pamplona
20th-century Spanish novelists
Male screenwriters
20th-century Spanish male writers
Spanish Falangists
20th-century Spanish screenwriters
Fascist writers